Jana Vaľová (born 8 July 1965) is a politician of the Slovak Republic. She has been a member of the National Council of the Slovak Republic, a district chairperson of the social-democratic political party Direction – Social Democracy, and Mayor of Humenné.

Education 
Vaľová received a general certificate of secondary education from the Medzilaborce agricultural technical secondary school. In 2008, V received a master's degree from the Faculty of Health and Social Sciences at the University of Trnava.V roku 2022 odhalili jej milenecký vzťah s poslancom NR SR Andrejom Stančíkom.  She received a doctorate degree in social work from the St. Elizabeth University of Health and Social Sciences in Bratislava in 2010. She speaks both English and Russian.

Career

Prešov self governing region (PSR)
In 2000, Vaľová entered politics, becoming a member and district chairperson of the Smer SD party. In 2005, she was elected a member of parliament in Prešov. Vaľová became president of the 'Committee of Culture and Ethnic Minorities'.
In 2009, Vaľová was reelected as MP in the PSR. She served as vice president of the 'Committee of Culture and Ethnic Minorities'.

Slovak republic
From 2006 to 2012, Vaľová was thrice elected to the National Council of the Slovak Republic. She worked on the 'Committee on Social Affairs and Housing'; the 'Evaluation Committee of the Council of Ministers for the Prevention and Control of Drug Addiction'; the 'Committee for European Affairs' (as a result of winning the PSR); and the 'Council for Gender Equality'.

Humenné
Concurrently, in 2010, in municipal elections Vaľová was elected mayor of Humenné by a coalition of Smer-SD, HZDS, SNS, Strana zelených (the Green Party), Úsvit, Slobodné Fórum and Nová demokracia (New Democracy).

References 

1965 births
Living people
Mayors of places in Slovakia
Women mayors of places in Slovakia
People from Humenné
Members of the National Council (Slovakia) 2006-2010
Members of the National Council (Slovakia) 2010-2012
Members of the National Council (Slovakia) 2012-2016
Members of the National Council (Slovakia) 2016-2020
Members of the National Council (Slovakia) 2020-present
21st-century Slovak women politicians
21st-century Slovak politicians
Female members of the National Council (Slovakia)